The private secretary to the prime minister for foreign affairs is a senior official in the British Civil Service who acts as the private secretary for all matters concerning foreign policy and international affairs to the prime minister of the United Kingdom.
The holder of this post has traditionally been a member of His Majesty's Diplomatic Service on secondment to the Cabinet Office, and reports directly to the principal private secretary to the prime minister.

List of private secretaries to the prime minister for foreign affairs 
1950–1952: David Hunt
1952–1955: Anthony Montague Browne
1955–1957: Guy Millard
1957–1963: Sir Philip de Zulueta
1963–1966: Oliver Wright
1966–1969: Michael Palliser
1969–1970: Edward Youde
1970–1972: Peter Moon
1972–1974: Thomas Bridges, 2nd Baron Bridges
1974–1977: Patrick Wright
 1977–1979: Bryan Cartledge
1979–1981: Michael Alexander
1981–1984: John Coles
1984–1991: Sir Charles Powell
1991–1993: Stephen Wall
1993–1996: Roderic Lyne
1996–1999: Sir John Holmes
1999–2001: John Sawers
2001–2003: Francis Campbell
2002–2004: Matthew Rycroft
2004–2007: Antony Phillipson
2007-2007: Matthew Gould
2007–2011: Thomas Fletcher
2011–2014: John Casson
2014–2016: Nigel Casey
2016-2019: Jonny Hall

See also 

 Prime Minister's Office
Principal Private Secretary to the Secretary of State for Foreign and Commonwealth Affairs

References

External links 
A DIRECTORY OF BRITISH DIPLOMATS, gulabin.com, December 2013

Lists of British people
Civil service positions in the United Kingdom
British Prime Minister's Office
Foreign relations of the United Kingdom